Elections to Portsmouth City Council took place on Thursday 2 May 2019, alongside other local elections across the country. The seats contested in this election were last contested in 2015. The Conservative Party had 8 seats they were defending, the Liberal Democrats 5 and Labour 1 seat. A by-election occurred within the vacant Cosham seat from last years election, due to the sitting Conservative standing down. No party gained a majority from this election, and therefore the council remains under no overall control.

Following the election, the Liberal Democrat minority administration that was formed in 2018 continued in office. Labour abstained on the vote for the council leader, with the Liberal Democrats winning the vote by virtue of being the single largest party.

Background 
Elections to Portsmouth council since 2012 have proven to have volatile and changing results, with eleven of the city’s fourteen wards  voting for different parties each year. Following the 2018 election in Portsmouth, in which one third of the council was elected, the UK Independence Party lost all of their seats. Gerald Vernon-Jackson became leader of the council.

A Conservative councillor for Cosham who was elected, James Fleming, was forced to resign as he was not attending meetings due to long term sickness. This means that the Cosham ward will have two seats up for election. The Conservatives also faced an internal inquiry during this campaign due to one of their former candidates claiming he was racially abused.

Election results 

Immediately ahead of this election, the composition of the council was:

After the election result, the composition of the council became:

As the council is elected in thirds, one councillor for each of the 14 wards are elected each year. All comparisons in seats and swing are to the corresponding 2015 election.

Results by ward
Comparisons for the purpose of determining a gain, hold or loss of a seat, and for all percentage changes, is to the last time these specific seats were up for election in 2015. An asterisk indicates the incumbent councillor.

Baffins

Central Southsea

Charles Dickens

Copnor

Cosham

Drayton & Farlington

Eastney and Craneswater

Fratton

Hilsea

Milton

Nelson

Paulsgrove

St Jude

St Thomas

References

2019 English local elections
2019
2010s in Hampshire
May 2019 events in the United Kingdom